City is a small village in the Vale of Glamorgan, Wales, United Kingdom.

Location 

It is quite near to the town of Cowbridge.

Origin of the name 

The village has never held the status of a city and "City" is not a recognisable Welsh word, so its origin is unclear. There is local speculation that the name came from an Anglicisation of Saith Tŷ, which is Welsh for "Seven Houses".

There is another place in Wales called City, in Montgomeryshire, as well as City Dulas in Anglesey.

Amenities 

The village has no shops. It used to have a pub called the City Inn, but it has now closed down. There is a village hall.

External links 
www.geograph.co.uk : photos of City and surrounding area

Villages in the Vale of Glamorgan